Ainhoa Pinedo González (born 17 February 1983) is a Spanish race walker who competes for Spain internationally.

Competition record

References

External links
 

1983 births
Living people
Spanish female racewalkers
Competitors at the 2009 Summer Universiade
Athletes from Madrid
20th-century Spanish women
21st-century Spanish women